Arthur Henry Dallimore (14 September 1873–23 July 1970) was a New Zealand Pentecostal minister and British-Israelite. He was born in Penshurst, Kent, England on 14 September 1873.

References

1873 births
1970 deaths
English emigrants to New Zealand
New Zealand Pentecostals
British Israelism